Major Sir Henry Paulet St John-Mildmay, 6th Baronet (28 April 1853 – 24 April 1916) was an English baronet and first-class cricketer. Mildmay was a right-handed batsman.

He was the son of Sir Henry St John-Mildmay, 5th Baronet by his wife Hon Helena Shaw Lefevre, and succeeded his father as baronet in 1902.

St John-Mildmay made his first-class debut for Hampshire against Sussex at the County Ground, Hove in 1881. St John-Mildmay played seven first-class matches for Hampshire between 1881 and 1884, with his final first-class match for the county coming in 1884 against Kent. In St John-Mildmay's seven first-class matches he scored 157 runs at a batting average of 11.41 and made a high score of 26. With the ball St John-Mildmay took a single wicket at the cost of 51 runs.

In addition to being a cricketer, St John-Mildmay served in Grenadier Guards, where he held the rank of Major. St John-Mildmay later became the 6th Baronet St. John. St John-Mildmay died at Dogmersfield, Hampshire on 24 April 1916.

References

External links
Henry Mildmay at Cricinfo
Henry Mildmay at CricketArchive

1853 births
1916 deaths
People from Westminster
Cricketers from Greater London
English cricketers
Hampshire cricketers
Grenadier Guards officers
St John-Mildmay, Henry
Henry